Briarwood Mall is a shopping mall in Ann Arbor, Michigan, United States. The mall's three anchor stores are Macy's, JCPenney, and Von Maur. Surrounded by office and other development, the mall anchors the southern Ann Arbor commercial area around Eisenhower Boulevard and I-94. It serves as the primary shopping mall for all of Washtenaw County. As of 2007 Simon Property Group manages and co-owns the mall (Simon owns 50%). Briarwood is considered a Class A mall property by developers based on its sales per square foot. Many restaurants, hotels and stores surround the mall.

History
Originally developed by developer A. Alfred Taubman, Briarwood opened on October 3, 1973. At the time, it was anchored by JCPenney and Sears, with Hudson's opening a year later. Lord & Taylor was later added as the mall's fourth anchor in 1980. The store closed in 1993 and became Jacobson's, which relocated from its flagship store in downtown Ann Arbor. 

Taubman's shopping center interests became a publicly traded real estate investment trust, Taubman Centers, in 1992.  In 1998 Taubman Centers simplified its corporate structure and turned over full ownership to its financial partner, the GM Pension Trusts. In 2001, Hudson's converted to Marshall Field's, which converted to Macy's five years later. Jacobson's would close in 2002 after the chain declared bankruptcy. Its location became the first Von Maur store in the state of Michigan in September 2003. The mall received a major renovation the following year. Taubman continued to manage the mall until 2004, when The Mills Corporation became 50 percent owner and manager.

In 2007, Simon Properties gained control of the Mills.  It is Simon's first managed property in the state of Michigan.

Briarwood Mall was home to a movie theater at its grand opening, originally run as "United Artists Briarwood." After the closure of many of United Artists' theaters in the late 1990s, the theater was operated as "Madstone Theater of Ann Arbor", "Village 7 Theaters", and "Movies at Briarwood." The theater was later reduced to four screens, as the other three screens were taken over by a new Pottery Barn. The theaters closed again in 2010, with an MC Sports replacing them. 

Briarwood received a major renovation in 2013 with new flooring, new lighting and redesigned mall entrances. Renovations also included LED lighting, and improved mall seating and bathrooms. In August 2014, Forever 21 opened a newer, larger store in the JCPenney wing, replacing space that was formerly occupied by Payless ShoeSource, Zales Jewelers, GameStop, Icing by Claire's, a salon, and a vacant Arby's. In 2015, Sears Holdings spun off 235 of its properties, including the Sears at Briarwood Mall, into Seritage Growth Properties. MC Sports closed in 2017 and the space was split up between Colby Bounce and a nail salon. However, Colby Bounce closed in 2018, and the space is currently Ballzy Ballz. On October 15, 2018, Sears announced that its Briarwood location would close after filing for Chapter 11 bankruptcy.

See also
Tourism in metropolitan Detroit

References

External links

Official Briarwood Mall website
 

Shopping malls in Michigan
Buildings and structures in Ann Arbor, Michigan
Shopping malls established in 1973
Simon Property Group
Tourist attractions in Ann Arbor, Michigan
1973 establishments in Michigan